Alfred Baum (23 September 1904 in Zurich – 30 September 1993 in Dietlikon) was a Swiss composer, pianist, and organist.

References

1904 births
1993 deaths
Swiss male composers
Swiss pianists
Swiss organists
Male organists
20th-century pianists
20th-century organists
Male pianists
20th-century male musicians
20th-century Swiss composers